The Las Animas Island gecko (Phyllodactylus apricus) is a species of gecko. It is endemic to Isla Las Ánimas in Mexico.

References

Phyllodactylus
Reptiles described in 1966